Worboys is an English surname, a variant of Warboys. Notable people with the surname include:

 Anne Eyre Worboys (1920–2007), New Zealand writer
 Gavin Worboys (born 1974), English footballer
 Helen Worboys, New Zealand politician
 John Worboys (born 1957), English criminal
 Mike Worboys (born 1947), British mathematician and computer scientist
 Walter Worboys (1900–1969), Australian-born British businessman

See also
 Worboys Committee, 1963 British government committee on road signage
 Warboys (surname)

References

Surnames
English-language surnames
Surnames of English origin
Surnames of British Isles origin
English toponymic surnames
Occupational surnames